The 2013 CEMAC Cup is the eighth edition of the CEMAC Cup, the football championship of Central African nations.
The tournament was held in Franceville and Bitam of Gabon from December 9–21.

Squads

Group stage

Group A

Group B

Knockout stage

Semi-finals

3rd-place play-off

Final

Individual scorers

4 goals
 Daniel Cousin

2 goals
 Thierry Makon

1 goal
 Moussa Limane
 Rudy Ndey
 Peque
 Thierry Fidjeu
 Edmond Mouele
 Bonaventure Sokambi
 Lionel Yacouya

Own goals
 Thierry Makon (for Gabon)

References 

CEMAC Cup
CEMAC